Tina Lattanzi (born Annunziata Concetta Costantini; 5 December 1897 – 25 October 1997) was an Italian actress and voice actress.

Biography
A native of Licenza and the daughter of Ercole Costantini and Geltrude Montori, Lattanzi began her acting career in 1922 when she met Vittorio De Sica, who in turn, introduced her to Tatyana Pavlova, who coached her into acting. Lattanzi was mainly active on stage during the 1920s before making her screen debut in 1930 and she was well known for her portrayals of women of noble birth. In 1954, Lattanzi began focusing her attention on television. Because of her drawl, persuasive voice, she also turned to the Cooperativa Doppiatori Cinematografici during the 1940s.

As a prominent dubbing artist, Lattanzi performed the Italian voices of some of the major film icons of the 20th century such as Greta Garbo, Rita Hayworth, Marlene Dietrich, Joan Crawford, Greer Garson, Myrna Loy, Rosalind Russell, Martita Hunt, Agnes Moorehead, Tamara Lees and Italian actresses such as Franca Marzi. In her animated roles, Lattanzi typically dubbed the Italian voices of villains such as the Evil Queen in Snow White and the Seven Dwarfs, Lady Tremaine in Cinderella, the Queen of Hearts in Alice in Wonderland and Maleficent in Sleeping Beauty.

By the time Lattanzi reached her sixties, there had been a decline in her career, yet she was still active on television. She eventually retired after an eye infection.

Personal life
Lattanzi married Giovanni Lattanzi in 1919 and took his name. They had two children, Fiorella and Glauco. They later divorced because of her acting obligations and her later relationship with her collaborator Guido Brignone.

Death
Lattanzi died in Rome on 25 October 1997, less than two months before her 100th birthday.

Filmography

Cinema

 La straniera (1930) – La signora Clarkson
 The Charmer (1931) – La signora Marchi, moglie di Giovanni
 Pergolesi (1932) – Erminia
 Five to Nil (1932) – Moglie del Presidente
 Loyalty of Love (1934) – L'imperatrice Carolina
 Red Passport (1935) – Giulia Martini
 The Ambassador (1936)
 Ginevra degli Almieri (1936) – Violante
 The Count of Brechard (1938) – Queen Maria Antonietta
 Bayonet (1938)
 Una lampada alla finestra (1940)
 Incanto di mezzanotte (1940) – Dora White
 Big Shoes (1940) – Sofia Garlandi
 The Daughter of the Green Pirate (1940) – Governatrice
 Beatrice Cenci (1941) – Lucrezia Cenci
 I mariti (Tempesta d'anime) (1941) – La baronessa Rita d'Isola
 Disturbance (1942) – La contessa di Greve
 Document Z-3 (1942) – La Semenoff
 The Two Orphans (1942) – La contessa Diana di Linières
 La morte civile (1942) – Geltrude Castaldi
 Wedding Day (1942) – La direttrice del collegio (uncredited)
 The Gorgon (1942) – La contessa Matilde di Toscana
 Romanzo di un giovane povero (1942) – Elisabetta
 Stasera niente di nuovo (1942) – La principale dell'istituto
 Giacomo the Idealist (1943) – La contessa Cristina Magnenzio
 Principessina (1943) – La principessa
 La danza del fuoco (1943) – La baronessa d'Avita
 T'amerò sempre (1943) – La signora Clerici (uncredited)
 La storia di una capinera (1943) – La madrigna di Maria
 La carica degli eroi (1943)
 Resurrection (1944) – La principessa Korciaghin
 The Charterhouse of Parma (1948) – La princesse Marie-Louise de Bourbon-Parme (uncredited)
 Guarany (1948)
 Buried Alive (1949) – Elena
 Monaca santa (1949) – Anastasia Grifo
 Torment (1950) – Matilde Ferrari
 47 morto che parla (1950) – La moglie dei sindaco
 The Ungrateful Heart (1951) – Elvira De Marchi
 Anna (1951) – La madre di Andrea
 Quattro rose rosse (1951)
 Deceit (1952) – Sig.ra Risasco, l'spettrice di polizia femminile
 The Unfaithfuls (1953) – Carla Bellaris
 I Chose Love (1953)
 Frine, Courtesan of Orient (1953) – La Morte (voice)
 The Count of Saint Elmo (1953) – Donna Clelia
 Processo contro ignoti (1954) – Moglie del giudice Ranieri
 Modern Virgin (1954) – Sig.ra Bardi
 Piccola santa (1954) – Contessa De Monte
 I pinguini ci guardano (1956) – (voice)
 Presentimento (1956) – La marchesa Giuliana De Angelis
 The Love Specialist (1957) – Adelaide Serravezza di Montalcino
 La trovatella di Pompei (1957) – Guglielmo Curti's Mother
 Knight of 100 Faces (1960) – Ausonia
 Silver Spoon Set (1960) – Alberto De Matteis's Mother
 The Minotaur, the Wild Beast of Crete (1960) – Queen Pasiphae
 Imperial Venus (1962)
 Catherine of Russia (1963) – Czarina Elizabeth
 The Leopard (1963)
 Orgasmo (1989) – Kathryn's Aunt
 The President of Borgorosso Football Club (1970) – Amelia Fornaciari
 Hospitals: The White Mafia (1973) – Vallotti's Mother
 The Sunday Woman (1975) – Massimo's Mother

References

External links

1897 births
1997 deaths
People from the Metropolitan City of Rome Capital
People from the Province of Frosinone
Italian film actresses
Italian voice actresses
Italian stage actresses
Italian television actresses
Italian radio actresses
20th-century Italian actresses